The 1963 ABC Championship was the second edition of the ABC Championship, a tournament which was held by FIBA Asia since 1960. The tournament which was held in Taipei, Taiwan saw eight teams compete (an expansion of one team) in a round-robin tournament with the top four teams qualifying through to the championship round where they played each other again one more time. The bottom four teams would compete in a classification round.

The tournament saw the first tie-breaker matches to be played with Thailand defeating Malaya to book a spot in the championship round. In the championship round, the Philippines and Taiwan finish level with an 8–2 record. This meant that they had to play in a play-off to decide the champion which was played on December 3. In that final match, the Philippines would claim their second title defeating Taiwan, 99–71. Third was South Korea who had defeated the play-off teams at least once during the tournament.

Preliminary round

 Since both Thailand and Malaya were tied on points, a play-off game was required to determine the fourth-placed team.

Final round
 The results and the points of the preliminary round shall be taken into account for the second round.

Classification 5th–8th

Championship

Since Taiwan and the Philippines were level on points, a play-off game for the championship was required.

Championship play-off

Final standing

Awards

See also
 List of sporting events in Taiwan

References

 Results
 archive.fiba.com

Asia Championship, 1963
1963
B 
International basketball competitions hosted by Taiwan
ABC Championship
ABC Championship